Lance Rock may refer to:

 Lance Hoyt, wrestler active under the ring name Lance Rock
 Lance Robertson, host of Nickelodeon program Yo Gabba Gabba! as DJ Lance Rock
 Lance Rocke, a character in the film Beyond the Valley of the Dolls
 Lance Rock (record label), for artists such as Man or Astro-man?